The men's shot put event at the 1983 Summer Universiade was held at the Commonwealth Stadium in Edmonton, Canada, on 5 and 6 July 1983.

Medalists

Results

Qualification

Final

References

Athletics at the 1983 Summer Universiade
1983